Jacek Chociej (born 28 June 1965) was a former professional footballer who played as a forward. He is most well known for his spell with Lechia Gdańsk having also made league appearances for ŁKS Łódź, Unia Skierniewice and Ursus Warsaw.

Biography
Born in Skierniewice Chociej started his playing career with the youth levels of Vis Skierniewice. He joined ŁKS Łódź, going on to make 1 league appearance for the club. After leaving ŁKS he had short spells with Unia Skierniewice and Ursus Warsaw before joining Lechia Gdańsk in 1987. He made his Lechia debut on 14 March 1987 against Górnik Zabrze. His first two seasons with Lechia were in the I liga, making 27 appearances and scored 1 goal in the top division for Lechia. The next 4 seasons were spent in the II liga, with Chociej retiring from football in 1992 having played his last game against Pogoń Szczecin on 6 June 1992. In total for Lechia he made 147 appearances and scored 13 goals in all competitions.

References

1965 births
ŁKS Łódź players
Lechia Gdańsk players
Polish footballers
Association football forwards
Living people
People from Skierniewice